Dane Ingham (born 8 June 1999) is a professional footballer who plays as a right wing-back for A-League club Newcastle Jets. Born and raised in Australia, he represents the New Zealand national team. Mainly a right wing-back or right-back, Ingham can also play on the left or as a right winger.

Club career

Brisbane Roar
Ingham made his professional debut in a 6–0 win against Global, in an AFC Champions League qualifier on 31 January 2017 at the age of 17 years, 5 months and 25 days. On his second appearance for Brisbane Roar, Dane scored his first goal against Perth Glory. In doing so he became the fourth youngest goal scorer in the A-League and the second youngest goal scorer for Brisbane Roar.

Perth Glory
On 25 June 2019, Ingham signed for Perth Glory.

On 22 June 2021 it was announced that Ingham would be leaving Perth Glory at the end of his contract after making 35 appearances for the club, scoring 3 goals.

International career
Eligible for Australia, New Zealand, or Samoa, Ingham was called up to the New Zealand national squad for World Cup qualifiers in March 2017, along with his brother Jai. He made his debut on 28 March 2017 against Fiji. Ingham was selected as part of the New Zealand squad for the 2017 FIFA Confederations Cup, playing all three games for the All Whites.

Career statistics

Club

Personal life
Ingham is the younger brother of Jai Ingham. He is of Samoan descent through his mother.

References

External links

1999 births
Living people
New Zealand association footballers
New Zealand international footballers
Australian soccer players
Australian sportspeople of Samoan descent
Australian people of New Zealand descent
New Zealand sportspeople of Samoan descent
New Zealand people of Australian descent
Association football defenders
Association football forwards
Brisbane Roar FC players
Perth Glory FC players
A-League Men players
National Premier Leagues players
2017 FIFA Confederations Cup players
Footballers at the 2020 Summer Olympics
Olympic association footballers of New Zealand
People from Lismore, New South Wales
Sportsmen from New South Wales
Soccer players from New South Wales